Group A of the 2002 Fed Cup Asia/Oceania Zone Group I was one of two pools in the Asia/Oceania Zone Group I of the 2002 Fed Cup. Five teams competed in a round robin competition, with the top two teams advancing to the play-offs and the bottom team being relegated to Group II for next year.

Indonesia vs. India

South Korea vs. New Zealand

South Korea vs. India

Chinese Taipei vs. New Zealand

Indonesia vs. Chinese Taipei

New Zealand vs. India

Indonesia vs. New Zealand

South Korea vs. Chinese Taipei

Indonesia vs. South Korea

Chinese Taipei vs. India

  failed to win any ties in the pool, and thus was relegated to Group II in 2003, where they finished first overall and thus advanced back to Group I for 2004.

See also
Fed Cup structure

References

External links
 Fed Cup website

2002 Fed Cup Asia/Oceania Zone